Zhdanov was a  of Soviet Navy.

Development and design 

The Sverdlov-class cruisers, Soviet designation Project 68bis, were the last conventional gun cruisers built for the Soviet Navy. They were built in the 1950s and were based on Soviet, German, and Italian designs and concepts developed prior to the Second World War. They were modified to improve their sea keeping capabilities, allowing them to run at high speed in the rough waters of the North Atlantic. The basic hull was more modern and had better armor protection than the vast majority of the post Second World War gun cruiser designs built and deployed by peer nations. They also carried an extensive suite of modern radar equipment and anti-aircraft artillery. The Soviets originally planned to build 40 ships in the class, which would be supported by the s and aircraft carriers.

The Sverdlov class displaced 13,600 tons standard and 16,640 tons at full load. The hull was a completely welded new design and the ships had a double bottom for over 75% of their length. The ship also had twenty-three watertight bulkheads. The Sverdlovs had six boilers providing steam to two shaft geared steam turbines generating .

Sverdlov-class cruisers main armament included twelve /57 cal B-38 guns mounted in four triple Mk5-bis turrets. They also had twelve /56 cal Model 1934 guns in six twin SM-5-1 mounts. For anti-aircraft weaponry, the cruisers had thirty-two  anti-aircraft guns in sixteen twin mounts and were also equipped with ten  torpedo tubes in two mountings of five each.

The Sverdlovs had   belt armor and had a   armored deck. The turrets were shielded by  armor and the conning tower, by  armor.

The cruisers' ultimate radar suite included one 'Big Net' or 'Top Trough' air search radar, one 'High Sieve' or 'Low Sieve' air search radar, one 'Knife Rest' air search radar and one 'Slim Net' air search radar. For navigational radar they had one 'Don-2' or 'Neptune' model. For fire control purposes the ships were equipped with two 'Sun Visor' radars, two 'Top Bow' 152 mm gun radars and eight 'Egg Cup' gun radars. For electronic countermeasures the ships were equipped with two 'Watch Dog' ECM systems.

Construction and career
Zhdanov was laid down on 11 February 1950 at Baltic Shipyard, Leningrad and launched on 27 December 1950. The vessel was commissioned on 31 December 1952. On 25 January 1953, the Soviet naval flag was raised aboard the ship when the cruiser became part of the 8th task force of the KBF. Her homeport was Tallinn. On 25 January 1954, on the occasion of the first anniversary of the raising of the naval flag, the commander-in-chief of the Soviet Navy, Admiral of the Fleet N.G. Kuznetsov, was present on the cruiser. On 24 December 1955, the cruiser was added to the Baltic Fleet.

In September 1988, Zhdanov took part in the exercises of the Black Sea Fleet "Autumn-88". The cruiser was command by Captain 1st Rank A. Rimashevsky. On 21 February 1989, the name Zhdanov was removed. A new one was not assigned, and the vessel was listed as KRU 101. On 10 December 1989,  by order of the Commander-in-Chief of the Soviet Navy, the vessel was re-registered as the command cruiser Zhdanov.

On 19 April 1990, the Soviet Navy flag was lowered and disarmament of the cruiser began for transfer to the Stock Property Department for dismantling and sale.  In February 1991, the crew of the cruiser was disbanded. The cruiser was sold to a private foreign company for scrap. On 27 November 1991, Zhdanov, with the tug Shakhtar, departed for the port of Alang, India, to be broken up.

Pennant numbers

Gallery

References

External links 
 Photo gallery

1950 ships
Ships of the Soviet Union
Ships built at the Baltic Shipyard
Naval ships of the Soviet Union
Sverdlov-class cruisers
Cold War cruisers of the Soviet Union